"Oceaniovalibus" is a Gram-negative genus of bacteria from the family of Rhodobacteraceae with one known species ("Oceaniovalibus guishaninsula"). "Oceaniovalibus guishaninsula" has been isolated from seawater from the coast of Guishan Island in Taiwan.

References

Rhodobacteraceae
Bacteria genera
Monotypic bacteria genera